Myopsaron nelsoni, is a species of sandburrower only known from around the Ogasawara Islands, Japan, where it has been collected at depths of from  over flat, sandy bottoms.  This species grows to a length of  SL.  This species is the only known member of its genus.

References

Creediidae

Fish of Japan
Fish described in 2010